The Iberian water shrew (Neomys anomalus) is a species of mammal in the insectivore family Soricidae.

Distribution

The Iberian water shrew is found in France, Portugal, and Spain.

Neomys anomalus was previously used in a broader sense for the Mediterranean water shrew, which had two subspecies: Neomys anomalus anomalus in the Iberian peninsula and Neomys anomalus millerii with a wide distribution from western Europe to southwest Asia. Following a phylogenetic analysis, the two subspecies were recognised as distinct species, Neomys anomalus for the Iberian species and Neomys milleri for the more widely distributed species.  The most recent conservation assessment of broadly defined species for the The IUCN Red List of Threatened Species gave a conservation status of Least Concern,  but the Iberian water shrew has not been assessed separately.

Feeding habits

It feeds mainly on amphibians and small fish, but also take insects and worms.  Because of its small size and thus higher surface area to volume ratio, it loses body heat more quickly and must eat two or three times its body mass each day.

References

Neomys
Mammals described in 1907